The Bolshaya Ercha is a river in the Sakha Republic (Yakutia), Russia. It is a tributary of the Indigirka.

The river flows north of the Arctic Circle, across desolate territories of the Allaikhovsky District.

Course
The Bolshaya Ercha is a right tributary of the Indigirka. It has its sources in the northern slopes of the Ulakhan-Sis range. The river flows first northwestwards in its uppermost section, and then in a roughly western / WSW direction skirting the Kondakov Plateau which rises to the north. In its last stretch the river descends into the Indigirka floodplain among numerous lakes where it meanders strongly, forming oxbow lakes. Finally the Bolshaya Ercha joins the Indigirka  from its mouth. Now uninhabited Vorontsovo village lies near the confluence, on the facing bank of the Indigirka.

Tributaries  
The river is frozen between the beginning of October and the beginning of June. There are more than 600 lakes in its basin.

See also
List of rivers of Russia

References

External links 
Fishing & Tourism in Yakutia
Сибирь. Древний Гранитный город Улахан-Сис - Rutube

Tributaries of the Indigirka
Rivers of the Sakha Republic
East Siberian Lowland